Bakker is a common Dutch surname equivalent to English Baker. In 2007 it was the seventh most common name in the Netherlands (55,273 people). Notable people with the surname include:

 Ada Bakker (b. 1948), Dutch tennis player
 Alexander Hugo Bakker Korff (1824–1882), Dutch genre painter
 Anneke B. Mulder-Bakker (b. 1940), Dutch medievalist
 Arnold Bakker (b. 1964), Dutch psychologist
 Arne Bakker (1930–2009), Norwegian footballer
 Bert Bakker (1912–1969), Dutch writer and publisher
 Billy Bakker (b. 1988), Dutch field hockey player
 Cees Bakker (b. 1945), Dutch football referee
 Cor Bakker (1918–2011), Dutch racing cyclist
 Cor Bakker (b. 1961), Dutch pianist
 Cornelis Bakker (1904–1960), Dutch nuclear physicist, Director-General of CERN 1955–1960
 Corrie Bakker (b. 1945), Dutch sprinter
 Danny Bakker (b. 1995), Dutch footballer for ADO Den Haag
 Danny Bakker (b. 1995), Dutch footballer for SC Cambuur
 Davy Bakker (b. 1972), Dutch cricketer
 Dick Bakker (b. 1947), Dutch composer, conductor and music producer
 Donald Bakker, Canadian convicted of sex tourism
 Edwin Bakker (b. 1967), Dutch terrorism scholar
 Egbert Bakker (b. 1958), Dutch classical scholar
 Erik Bakker (b. 1990), Dutch footballer
 Ernst Bakker (1946–2014), Dutch politician
 Eshly Bakker (b. 1993), Dutch footballer
 Geert Bakker (1921–1993), Dutch Olympic sailor
 Gerbrand Bakker (1771–1828), Dutch physician
 Gerbrand Bakker (b. 1962), Dutch novelist
 Gijs Bakker (b. 1942), Dutch jewelry designer
 Glenys Bakker (b. 1962), Canadian curler
 Hans T. Bakker (b. 1948), Dutch Indologist
 Huib Bakker (b. 1965), Dutch physicist
 Ina Boudier-Bakker (1875–1966), Dutch writer of novels
 Ineke Bakker (b. 1956), Dutch sprint canoeist
 Isabella C. Bakker, Canadian political scientist
 Jan Albert Bakker (b. 1935), Dutch archaeologist
 Jarich Bakker (b. 1974), Dutch track cyclist
 Jason Bakker (b. 1967), Australian cricketer
 Jay Bakker (b. 1975), American pastor, founder of Revolution Church, son of Jim and Tammy Faye
 Jelle Bakker (b. 1985) Dutch YouTuber
 Jim Bakker (b. 1940), American televangelist
 Joop Bakker (1921–2003), Dutch politician
 Justin Bakker (b. 1998), Dutch footballer
 Kees Bakker (1931–2010), Dutch ecologist
 Keith Bakker (b. 1960), American-Dutch mental health practitioner
 Klaas Bakker (1926–2016), Dutch footballer
 Laurens Bakker (b. 1950s), Dutch heavy metal drummer
 Marcus Bakker (1923–2009), Dutch communist politician
 Mees Bakker (b. 2001), Dutch footballer
 Mitchel Bakker (b. 2000), Dutch footballer
 Nick Bakker (b. 1992), Dutch footballer
 Nordin Bakker (b. 1997), Dutch footballer
 Patrick Bakker (1910–1932), Dutch painter
 Paul-Jan Bakker (b. 1957), Dutch cricketer
 Peter Bakker (b. 1961), Dutch businessman
 Peter Bakker (rower) (b. 1934), Dutch rower
 Piet Bakker (1897–1960), Dutch journalist and author
 Piet Bakker (b. c. 1925), Dutch sprint canoeist
  (1941–2007), Dutch defense lawyer
 Robert T. Bakker (b. 1945), American paleontologist
 Robert Bakker (rower) (b. 1962), Dutch rower
 Robin Bakker (b. 1959), Australian rower
 R. Scott Bakker (b. 1967), Canadian fantasy author
 Sharona Bakker (b. 1990), Dutch hurdler
  (b. 1974), Dutch dietician
 Tammy Faye Bakker (1942–2007), American Christian singer and televangelist
 Tim Bakker (b. 1977), Canadian football player

 De Bakker
 Jaco de Bakker (1939–2012), Dutch computer scientist
 Jan de Bakker (1499–1525), Dutch priest executed for heresy
 Joseph De Bakker (b. 1934), Belgian cyclist
 Paul de Bakker (b. 1973), Dutch bioinformatician
 Thiemo de Bakker (b. 1988), Dutch tennis player

 Den Bakker
 Maarten den Bakker (b. 1969), Dutch road bicycle racer 

 Bakkers
 Erik Bakkers (b. 1972), Dutch physicist

See also
 Baker (surname)
 Backer
 Bäcker
 Becker (surname)

References 

Dutch-language surnames
Occupational surnames